Shackle Island is a census-designated place and unincorporated community in Sumner County, Tennessee, United States. Its population was 2,844 as of the 2010 census

Demographics

2020 census

As of the 2020 United States census, there were 3,331 people, 1,042 households, and 916 families residing in the CDP.

Geography

References

Census-designated places in Sumner County, Tennessee
Census-designated places in Tennessee
Unincorporated communities in Tennessee